A cantor or chanter is a person who leads people in singing or sometimes in prayer. In formal Jewish worship, a cantor is a person who sings solo verses or passages to which the choir or congregation responds.

In Judaism, a cantor sings and leads congregants in prayer in Jewish religious services; sometimes called a hazzan. A cantor in Reform and Conservative Judaism, just like in Orthodox Judaism, goes through years of extensive religious education, similar to that of a Rabbi, in order to become an officially recognized cantor. They often come from a long line of cantors in their family; born with a natural gift of singing with incredible vocal range.

The term itself was shaped by the Latin term for "singer", but is not an inherently Latin word. It is frequently used to translate a range of equivalent terms in other languages, such as for the leader of singing on a traditional Kerala snake boat, a Chundan Vallam. A similar term is precentor, defined as a leader of the singing of a choir or congregation.

More specific types of cantor include:

Hazzan in Judaism, a singer and/or musician. Orthodox Judaism only allows men to be cantors, while the other branches allow women. Reform Judaism and Orthodox Judaism ordain cantors from seminaries. Ordained cantors serve as clergy in their congregations and perform all ministerial rites as rabbis.
 An ordained muezzin, who calls the Adhan in Islam for prayer, that serves as clergy in their congregations and perform all ministerial rites as imams.
Cantor in Christianity, an ecclesiastical officer leading liturgical music in several branches of the Christian church
Protopsaltis, leader master cantor of the right choir (Orthodox Church)
 Lampadarios, leader of the left choir (Orthodox Church)
 Domestikos, leader assistant to the Protopsaltis of the right choir and/or to the Lampdarios of the left choir (Orthodox Church)
 Precentor
 Succentor

See also
Jewish prayer

References

Religious music
Religious occupations
Broad-concept articles